Shine a Light is the soundtrack to the Rolling Stones' concert film of the same name, directed by Martin Scorsese. It was released on 1 April 2008 in the UK by Polydor Records and one week later in the United States by Interscope Records. Double disc and single disc versions were issued.

History
Shine a Light is the 10th concert album released by the Rolling Stones. Like the two 2006 shows from which it was culled, it features no songs from their 2005 album A Bigger Bang. The two-disc version features all but two of the songs played on the two nights; the missing numbers are "Undercover of the Night" (included as a bonus track on the Japanese edition and as a download on iTunes Store) and "Honky Tonk Women."

Shine a Light features guest musicians Jack White on "Loving Cup," Christina Aguilera on "Live with Me" and Buddy Guy on "Champagne and Reefer."

The album was well-received, especially in the UK, where it debuted at No. 2, selling 23,013 copies in its first week – the best chart position for a Rolling Stones concert album since Get Yer Ya-Ya's Out! in 1970. In the United States, it debuted at No. 11 on the Billboard charts with 37,117 copies sold – the band's highest U.S. debut for a concert album since 1995's Stripped.

Complete Song List

Titles marked with asterisks have been released on CD and/or DVD.

29 October
"Start Me Up"
"Shattered"
"She Was Hot"
"All Down the Line"
"Loving Cup"
"As Tears Go By"
"I'm Free"*
"Undercover of the Night"*
"Just My Imagination"
"Shine a Light"*
"Champagne and Reefer"
"Tumbling Dice"
"You Got the Silver"
"Little T&A"*
"Sympathy for the Devil"
"Live with Me"
"Paint it Black"*
"Jumpin' Jack Flash"
"Brown Sugar"

1 November
"Jumpin' Jack Flash"*
"Shattered"*
"She Was Hot"*
"All Down the Line"*
"Loving Cup"*
"As Tears Go By"*
"I'm Free"
"Some Girls"*
"Just My Imagination"*
"Far Away Eyes"*
"Champagne and Reefer"*
"Tumbling Dice"*
"You Got the Silver"*
"Connection"*
"Sympathy for the Devil"*
"Live with Me"*
"Honky Tonk Women"
"Start Me Up"*
"Brown Sugar"*
"Satisfaction"*

Track listing
All songs by Mick Jagger and Keith Richards, except where noted.

Double-disc edition

Single-disc edition

Personnel
The Rolling Stones
Mick Jagger – lead vocals, guitar, harmonica
Keith Richards – guitar, backing vocals on "Far Away Eyes" and "I'm Free", lead vocals on "You Got The Silver", "Connection" and "Little T&A"
Ron Wood – guitar, pedal steel guitar on "Far Away Eyes"
Charlie Watts – drums

Additional musicians
Darryl Jones – bass guitar
Christina Aguilera – vocals on "Live with Me"
Buddy Guy – guitar and vocals on "Champagne and Reefer"
Jack White – guitar and vocals on "Loving Cup"
Chuck Leavell – keyboards, backing vocals
Lisa Fischer - backing vocals
Bernard Fowler - backing vocals, percussion
Blondie Chaplin - backing vocals, percussion, acoustic guitar
Bobby Keys - saxophone
Michael Davis - trombone
Kent Smith - trumpet
Tim Ries - saxophone, keyboards

Reception
"Maybe they've been fired up by Scorsese's fan worship, or it's simple professional pride," wrote Mark Blake in Q, "but everyone seems to have raised their game. In an era when a Rolling Stones live show can sometimes become a pantomime, Shine a Light is closer to a proper rock 'n' roll circus."

"Buddy Guy was incredible," remarked Charlie Watts. "Jack White was great. And I thought Christina Aguilera was amazing, because often those girls freeze when they dance with Mick. We've had some great people – including our dear Amy [Winehouse], although I don't think she was quite well – who were never as good as Christina."

Charts

Weekly charts

Year-end charts

Certification

References

External links
Official press release on RollingStones.com

2008 live albums
Albums produced by Bob Clearmountain
The Rolling Stones live albums
Concert film soundtracks
2008 soundtrack albums
Interscope Records live albums
Interscope Records soundtracks
Polydor Records live albums
Polydor Records soundtracks